Halumsar (also Romanized as Halūmsar) is a village in Bala Khiyaban-e Litkuh Rural District, in the Central District of Amol County, Mazandaran Province, Iran. At the 2006 census, its population was 778, in 188 families.

References 

Populated places in Amol County